2010 Thai League Division 1 is the 13th season of the League since its establishment in 1997. It is the feeder league for the Thai Premier League. A total of 16 teams will compete in the league.

League Expansion
It was announced at the end of the season that the TPL would increase the number of teams for the start of the 2011 Thai Premier League season. Therefore, at the end of season the three teams in the Thai Premier League that finished the season in the bottom three places (14th, 15th and 16th) would face the fourth, fifth and sixth teams from Division One in a promotion/relegation series.

The six teams will be divided into two groups of three. They will meet each other in their group on a home-and-away basis with the winner of each group earning spots in the top flight next season.

It was also announced somewhat belatedly that the teams that finished in the bottom four places, who would normally be relegated would play in an end of season promotion/relegation series against the teams coming 3rd and 4th in the 2010 Regional League Division 2 championship stage. Games would be played on a home and away basis to decide who would play in the 2011 Thai Division 1 League.

Changes from last season

Team changes

From Division 1
Promoted to Thai Premier League
 Police United
 Royal Thai Army
 Sisaket

Relegated to Regional League Division 2
 Nakhon Sawan
 Thai Airways-Ban Bueng
 Surat Thani

Relegated from Thai Premier League
 Sriracha
 Chula United
 Nakhon Pathom

Promoted from Regional League Division 2
 Raj Pracha-Nonthaburi
 Chiangrai United
 Narathiwat

Teams

Stadia and locations

Name Changes

Customs Department were renamed Suvarnabhumi Customs.
Rattana Bundit were renamed RBAC Mittraphap.
Royal Thai Air Force rebranded and renamed Air Force United.

League table

TPL/Division 1 Playoffs

Group A

Group B

Division 1/Regional League Playoffs

Results

Winners over two legs progress to the 2011 Division One league season, losers go to the Regional League

Results

Top scorers

See also
 2010 Thai Premier League
 2010 Regional League Division 2
 2010 Thai FA Cup
 2010 Kor Royal Cup

References

External links
Official website

2
2010